Arthur Meyer (1850–1922) was a German botanist, cell biologist, and pharmacognosist. Meyer is known for his pioneering work describing the structure of chloroplasts (which Meyer called "autoplasts") and other plastids. He was the first to name and describe the chlorophyll-containing structures in chloroplasts known as grana.

Meyer spent his academic career at the University of Marburg, where he was a member of the school's Marburg Circle, an interdisciplinary biological discussion group centered on Emil von Behring.

References

Works
 Wissenschaftliche Drogenkunde : ein illustriertes Lehrbuch der Pharmakognosie u. eine wissenschaftliche Anleitung zur eingehenden botanischen Untersuchung pflanzlicher Drogen für Apotheker. Band 1 . Gaertner, Berlin 1891 Digital edition by the University and State Library Düsseldorf
 Wissenschaftliche Drogenkunde : ein illustriertes Lehrbuch der Pharmakognosie u. eine wissenschaftliche Anleitung zur eingehenden botanischen Untersuchung pflanzlicher Drogen für Apotheker. Band 2 . Gaertner, Berlin 1892 Digital edition by the University and State Library Düsseldorf

External links
 
 by Arthur Meyer, 1883. (Full text, in German, at Google Books.)

1850 births
1922 deaths
Scientists from Marburg
19th-century German botanists
Cell biologists
20th-century German botanists